Russell E. Tucker is a  Democratic member of the North Carolina General Assembly, representing the state's fourth House district from 1999 to 2003 and again from 2005 until retiring in 2011.

References

External links
North Carolina General Assembly - Representative Russell E. Tucker
Project Vote Smart - Representative Russell E. Tucker (NC) profile 
Follow the Money - Russell E. Tucker
2008 2006 2004 2002 2000 1998 1996 campaign contributions

|-

Members of the North Carolina House of Representatives
1943 births
Living people
21st-century American politicians
People from Duplin County, North Carolina